Rapid Racer, known as Turbo Prop Racing in North America, is a racing video game developed by SCE Studios Soho and published by Sony Computer Entertainment exclusively for the PlayStation. In the game, the player takes control of a motorboat and races around six different tracks. Eventually, all six tracks can be raced mirrored, as well as set at night time.

By winning championships and completing bonus rounds (unlocked by five yellow icons during a race but first two-day tracks), players can unlock them which they can use to either upgrade their boat or unlock a higher-powered one.

Gameplay
Rapid Racer was one of the first PlayStation games to take full advantage of the DualShock controller; the game allow steering with the analog sticks, and the gamepad vibrates during gameplay. The intensity of the vibrations depends on what type of water the player is in; calm rapids mean low vibrations, while heavier rapids give high vibrations.

After reaching a certain point in the game, players can unlock the Fractal Generator. This feature allows the player to select from a large number of tracks besides the normal six. Players can either allow the generator to randomly select a track or manually input their own.

Development
Work on Rapid Racer began in 1995. Six months were spent modeling the physics and behavior of the water. The European version of the game runs at 50 frames per second, while the North American version runs at 60 frames per second.

The game's soundtrack was composed by Apollo Four Forty (Loudmouth in Turbo Prop Racing). The game's main theme "Carrera Rapida" by Apollo 440 was released as a single and on their 1997 album Electro Glide in Blue.

Reception

Rapid Racer received above-average reviews according to the review aggregation website GameRankings. In Japan, where the game was ported for release on 16 July 1998, Famitsu gave it a score of 27 out of 40.

GameSpot criticized the courses for being very narrow and limited, but praised the game's "hip-hop/techno" music, comparing it favorably to that of Wipeout. Edge highlighted the fluid graphics and frame rate, but criticized the unoriginal gameplay and unrealistic boat handling, which can frustrate players. The magazine concluded: "As a technological showcase, Rapid Racer is a truly impressive achievement. As a game in its own right, however, it falls disappointingly short of the expectations aroused by its glorious visuals." However, Next Generation said, "Anyone who thinks that PlayStation is finished should check this game out."

References

External links

1997 video games
Motorboat racing video games
Multiplayer and single-player video games
PlayStation (console) games
PlayStation Network games
Racing video games set in the United States
Sony Interactive Entertainment games
Video games developed in the United Kingdom
Video games set in Africa
Video games set in Canada
Video games set in Miami
Team Soho games